Uriel Macias (born December 9, 1994) is an American soccer player who plays for Fort Wayne.

Career

College
Macias played four years of college soccer at Indiana University – Purdue University Indianapolis between 2014 and 2017. During his time with the Jaguars, he made 53 appearances, scored 15 goals and tallied four assists.

Professional
Macias signed with United Soccer League club Colorado Springs Switchbacks on February 22, 2018. In May 2021, Macias joined USL League Two side Fort Wayne.

References

1994 births
Living people
American soccer players
Association football midfielders
Colorado Springs Switchbacks FC players
IUPUI Jaguars men's soccer players
People from Ligonier, Indiana
Soccer players from Indiana
USL Championship players